= Rolf Olaf Berg =

Norwegian civil servant and diplomat

- Born: 16 July 1939 (age 86); Stavanger

Rolf Olaf Berg (born 16 July 1939) is a Norwegian civil servant and diplomat.

He was born in Stavanger and holds the cand.philol. degree. He was hired by the Ministry of Foreign Affairs in 1971. He served as Norway's consul-general in Cape Town, South Africa from 1990 to 1992, Norway's ambassador to Mexico from 1992 to 1996, then a special adviser in the Ministry of Foreign Affairs before serving a last term as Norway's ambassador to Guatemala from 2000 to 2005.
